Clivina brevicornis is a species of ground beetle in the subfamily Scaritinae. It was described by C.D. Darlington in 1962.

References

brevicornis
Beetles described in 1962